Mark Mayer is a British biologist.

Marc Mayer or Mark Meyer may also refer to:
 
 Marc Mayer, Canadian arts manager and curator
 Marc Mayer (skier), Austrian cross-country skier
 Mark A. Meyer, founder and president of the Romanian-American Chamber of Commerce
 Mark Meyer (politician), Wisconsin politician